Angel Lam is a New York-based Hong Kong-born composer and writer. She has composed for artists and ensembles such as Yo-Yo Ma, Aldo Parisot, The Silk Road Ensemble, Atlanta Symphony, Minnesota Orchestra, Hong Kong Arts Festival, Aspen Music Festival and Pacific Music Festival, among others.

Biography
Lam holds degrees from Yale University, the Peabody Conservatory of Johns Hopkins University, and Hong Kong Academy for Performing Arts.  She first received a commission from Carnegie Hall's Weill Music Institute in 2006. The resulting piece she composed, "Empty Mountain, Spirit Rain," caught the attention of Yo-Yo Ma, who is the artistic director of The Silk Road Ensemble.  They took the piece on worldwide concert tours throughout the United States, Europe, Canada, Japan, South East Asia, and China, and recorded her piece on two CDs "New Impossibilities" and "Off the Map".  The latter album, where Lam was one of four featured composers, was nominated for a GRAMMY in the Best Classical Crossover category.

For her second commission from Carnegie Hall, she created the song cycle "Sun, Moon, and Star" with mentorship from Osvaldo Golijov and Dawn Upshaw. In the same year, she was mentored by theater artist Martha Clarke to create her theater work "Midnight Run" for music, dance and visual projections in collaboration with the historic Peabody Dance in Baltimore. Other premieres of her works include Colorado Symphony Orchestra, New York's Greenwich Village Orchestra, New York University Symphony Orchestra, Hong Kong Sinfonietta, Chicago's Northwest Symphony and Symphony of Oak Park and River Forest, University of California Irvine Symphony Orchestra, Norfolk Chamber Music Festival, Yale Philharmonia, Interlochen Arts Academy, Los Angeles Loyola Choir Men's Chorus and Orchestra, and Orange County Women's Chorus.

In 2009, she was voted "Artist of the Month" by the magazine Musical America, and by Yale Alumni Magazine of Yale University as "Yalie of the Week".  In the same year, she received a commission to compose "Awakening from a Disappearing Garden", a cello and orchestra work for Yo-Yo Ma and the Atlanta Symphony Orchestra, with the New York premiere at Carnegie Hall's China Festival "Ancient Paths, Modern Voices".

She was a featured New Stage Theater composer at the 40th Hong Kong Arts Festival.  As composer, librettist, and story writer, she premiered her musical "June Lovers", featuring Atlanta Symphony Orchestra violinist and concertmaster David Coucheron and conductor Perry So, along with six singers and actors with an ensemble of eight musicians.  She currently resides in New York City and also writes critical reviews for the Broadway, Off-Broadway and indie shows review website Theasy.com.  She is a member of the Distinguished Artist Council of the Johns Hopkins University and Hong Kong Jockey Club Music and Dance Fund Awardees Association.

External sources
The Silk Road Project - Angel Lam
Gramophone review Off The Map
Yo-Yo Ma Premiere Awakening from a Disappearing Garden
The Decade the World Tilted East - Financial Times article
Musical America Artist of the Month - Angel Lam
Carnegie Hall Blog, Yo-Yo Ma Premiere in Ancient Paths, Modern Voices - Composer Angel Lam
Yale Cellos World Premiere by Composer Angel Lam

References

External links 
Angel Lam Homepage

Year of birth missing (living people)
Living people
Chinese composers
Yale University alumni
Peabody Institute alumni
Alumni of The Hong Kong Academy for Performing Arts